Lonchidion is a genus of extinct Hybodontiform shark in the family Lonchidiidae. The genus first appears in the fossil record during the late Triassic and continues to be found until the late cretaceous.  

Lonchidion was first described by R. Estes in 1964, and the type species is L. selachas. Fossils of Lonchidion have been discovered across North America, Eurasia, India and northwest Africa in sediments representative of a variety of environments.  A new species, L. ferganensis, was described by Jan Fischer, Sebastian Voigt, Jörg W. Schneider, Michael Buchwitz and Silke Voigt in 2011, from fossilized teeth and egg capsules.

Species
 Lonchidion anitae Thurmond, 1971
 Lonchidion breve Patterson, 1966
 Lonchidion crenulatum Patterson, 1966
 Lonchidion humblei Murry, 1981
 Lonchidion indicus Yadagiri, 1986
 Lonchidion inflexum Underwood & Rees, 2002
 Lonchidion microselachos Estes & Sanchíz, 1982
 Lonchidion selachas Estes, 1964
 Lonchidion selachos Estes, 1964
 Lonchidion striatum Patterson, 1966
 Lonchidion ferganensis Fischer et al., 2011

References

External links
 Lonchidion at the Paleobiology Database

Triassic sharks 
Cretaceous sharks
Hybodontiformes
Triassic fish of Asia
Hell Creek fauna
Laramie Formation
Camarillas Formation
Madygen Formation
Fossil taxa described in 1964